Patrick David Newell (27 March 1932 – 22 July 1988) was a British actor, known for his large size.

Early life and education
The second son of Eric Llewellyn Newell, of High Lodge, Hadleigh, Suffolk, an Oxford-educated physician who served as a Captain in the Royal Army Medical Corps, Newell was educated at Taunton School and completed his National Service, where a fellow recruit was Michael Caine, before training at the Royal Academy of Dramatic Art, alongside Albert Finney and Peter O'Toole.

Career
Newell began to be seen frequently on TV, usually cast as a fat villain or in comic roles. Given his rotund appearance and ability for playing slightly stuffy types, he was a natural stooge in several comedy shows, first for Arthur Askey, in Arthur's Treasured Volumes (ATV, 1960), then for Jimmy Edwards in Faces of Jim (BBC, 1962), with Ronnie Barker also supporting.

He was originally cast as one of the inept recruits in the first of the Carry On films, 1958's Carry On Sergeant but, according to producer Peter Rogers, Newell turned up on the first day of filming, only to recognise the real-life sergeant hired to drill the cast as the one who'd made his life hell in the Army. He then, so Rogers claims, got into his Rolls-Royce, drove off and was never seen again.

In an interview with TV Times, in 1968, he claimed to have gained weight as a deliberate attempt to boost his career, marking him out for some niche roles. In Who's Who on Television in the late 1970s, Newell described himself as "Actor with a weight problem—the more he diets, the less work he seems to get."

His most notable role was as "Mother", the spymaster in The Avengers. He had previously appeared in two earlier Avengers episodes: "The Town of No Return" (Diana Rigg's debut) and, as a Minister of the Crown, in series five's "Something Nasty in the Nursery".

Other cult television appearances included roles in Maigret,  The Persuaders!, Randall and Hopkirk (Deceased), the Doctor Who story "The Android Invasion", The Young Ones and Kinvig.

Newell played Inspector Lestrade in the 1980 TV series, Sherlock Holmes and Doctor Watson, made in Poland. He also turned up as a Playboy Bunny in one of the Benny Hill comedy specials. Film appearances include the Gluttony segment of The Magnificent Seven Deadly Sins (1971).

In 1984, he landed a more significant role, as Sutton/Blessington in ITV's well-received The Adventures of Sherlock Holmes production of "The Adventure of the Resident Patient", alongside Jeremy Brett.

Later in life Newell succeeded in losing a substantial amount of weight, but this did not prevent his early death from a heart attack. He was married and had two children.

Selected filmography

 Dial 999 (1955) – Brewers Man (uncredited)
 The Rebel (1961) – Art Gallery Patron (uncredited)
 Night Without Pity (1961) – Doctor
 Crooks Anonymous (1962) – 2nd Jeweller
 The Boys (1962) – Crowhurst
 The Dock Brief (1962) – 1st Warder
 Unearthly Stranger (1963) – Maj. Clarke
 Never Mention Murder (Edgar Wallace Mysteries - 1964) – Barman
 Father Came Too! (1964) – King Harold
 Becket (1964) – William of Corbeil (uncredited)
 Do You Know This Voice? (1964) – Neighbor
 Every Day's a Holiday (1964) – Mr. Hoskins
 The Alphabet Murders (1965) – Cracknell
 A Study in Terror (1965) – PC Benson
 Bindle (One of Them Days) (1966) – Mr. Hearty
 The Sandwich Man (1966) – River Bus Man
 The Long Duel (1967) – Colonel
 Danny the Dragon (1967) – Potter
 The Strange Affair (1968) – Victim
 The Magnificent Seven Deadly Sins (1971) – Doctor (segment "Gluttony")
 The Canterbury Tales (1972) – Prior (uncredited)
 Go for a Take (1972) – Generous Jim
 Where's Johnny? (1974) – Basil
 Vampira (1974) – Man in Hotel Room
 Man About the House (1974) – Sir Edmund Weir
 The Incredible Sarah (1976) – Major
 Stand Up, Virgin Soldiers (1977) – M. O. Billings
 The Golden Lady (1979) – Charlie Whitlock
 The Shillingbury Blowers (1980) – Mr. Meadows
 Young Sherlock Holmes (1985) – Bentley Bobster
 Redondela (1987) – José María Gil Ramos
 Consuming Passions (1988) – Lester (final film role)

Television series
 Deadline Midnight (1961) –  Bertie Miller
 Danger Man (1964) – Alex
 Thorndyke (1964) –  Polton
 The Idiot (1966) – Lebediev
 The Illustrated Weekly Hudd (1966)
 Room at the Bottom (1967) – Cyril Culpepper
 All Gas and Gaiters (1967) - Ghost
 The Avengers (1968) – Mother / Sir George Collins / Smallwood
 Randall and Hopkirk (Deceased) - The Man From Nowhere (1968) – Mannering
 Never Say Die (1970) – Mr. Oliphant
 The Misfit (1971) – Stanley Allenby-Johnson
 The Des O'Connor Show (1971)
 Casanova (1971) – Schalon
 Sadie, It's Cold Outside (1975) – Chip shop proprietor
 Moll Flanders (1975) – Thomas Woodall
 Wilde Alliance ('A Question of Research ', 'A Game for Two Players', episodes) (1978) - Bailey
 Sherlock Holmes and Doctor Watson (unscreened) (1980) – Inspector Lestrade
 The Whizzkid's Guide (1981–1983) 
 Doctors' Daughters (1981) – Archdeacon Bellwether 
 Kinvig (1981) – Mr. Horsley
 Jemima Shore Investigates – Jamie
 Bottle Boys (1984) – Mr. Dawson
 Sherlock Holmes- The Resident Patient (1985) – Blessington/Sutton
 Ladies in Charge (1986) – Maxwell

References

External links

1932 births
1988 deaths
English male television actors
English male film actors
People from Hadleigh, Suffolk
20th-century English male actors
Alumni of RADA
Royal Fusiliers soldiers
Military personnel from Suffolk